The Pale Count (Swedish: Bleka greven) is a 1937 Swedish comedy film directed by Gösta Rodin and starring Carl Schenstrøm, Harald Madsen and Hilding Gavle. The film's sets were designed by the art director Bertil Duroj.

Synopsis
A series of hauntings take place at a baronial residence, but it becomes clear that these are in fact being staged to scare the occupants away.

Cast
 Carl Schenstrøm as Fyrtornet
 Harald Madsen as 	Släpvagnen
 Hilding Gavle as 	Count Rouglas Gyllenspjuth
 Anna Olin as Countess Evelina Gyllenspjuth
 Karin Albihn as 	Anne-Marie Andersson
 Gösta Gustafson as 	Larsson
 Aina Rosén as 	Betty Larsson
 Magnus Kesster as 	Göran
 Torsten Bergström as Lawyer
 Emil Fjellström as 	Olsson

References

Bibliography 
 Larsson, Mariah & Marklund, Anders. Swedish Film: An Introduction and Reader. Nordic Academic Press, 2010.

External links 
 

1937 films
Swedish comedy films
1937 comedy films
1930s Swedish-language films
Films directed by Gösta Rodin
Swedish black-and-white films
1930s Swedish films